Stephen James Morgan (born 28 December 1970) is a Welsh former professional footballer, who played as a winger. He made appearances in the English Football League for Oldham Athletic, Wrexham and Rochdale. He also played non-league football for Stalybridge Celtic and Colwyn Bay.

References

1970 births
Living people
English footballers
Association football wingers
Oldham Athletic A.F.C. players
Wrexham A.F.C. players
Rochdale A.F.C. players
Stalybridge Celtic F.C. players
Colwyn Bay F.C. players
English Football League players